John Bennett (1777 – July 1857) was an English professional cricketer who made 61 known appearances in first-class cricket matches between 1797 and 1818.  His cousin was James Bennett who played in five matches from 1798 to 1805. Not to be confused with John Bennett (Derbyshire cricketer)

Career
Bennett was mainly associated with Hampshire but also represented All-England, Marylebone Cricket Club (MCC) and other teams.  He played for the Players in the inaugural and second Gentlemen v Players matches in 1806.

He was a fast underarm bowler (hand unknown), a left-handed batsman and an occasional wicketkeeper.  He was "an excellent field", generally at mid-wicket.  As a batsman, Bennett was described as "a fine and free hitter".  His bowling speed was reportedly "very fast".

Personal life
John Bennett was a farmer who lived in Kingsley all his life. He suffered badly from gout for the last thirty years of his life.

References

1777 births
1857 deaths
English cricketers
English cricketers of 1787 to 1825
Hampshire cricketers
Players cricketers
The Bs cricketers
Non-international England cricketers
Lord Frederick Beauclerk's XI cricketers
Homerton Cricket Club cricketers
William Ward's XI cricketers
George Osbaldeston's XI cricketers
T. Mellish's XI cricketers